Calpocalyx klainei, the misise, misizé, or mississé, is a species of flowering plant in the family Fabaceae. It is found in Cameroon and Gabon. It is threatened by habitat loss.

References

Mimosoids
Vulnerable plants
Taxonomy articles created by Polbot